Under Texas Skies is a 1940 American Western "Three Mesquiteers" B-movie directed by George Sherman and starring Robert Livingston, Bob Steele, and starring Rufe Davis. It was produced and released by Republic Pictures.

Cast
 Robert Livingston as Stony Brooke
 Bob Steele as Tucson Smith
 Rufe Davis as Lullaby Joslin
 Lois Ranson as Helen Smith
 Henry Brandon as Tom Blackton
 Wade Boteler as Sheriff Brooke
 Rex Lease as Jim Marsden
 Jack Ingram as Henchman Finley
 Walter Tetley as Theodore - Barber-Shop Boy
 Yakima Canutt as Henchman Talbot
 Earle Hodgins as Smithers - the Barber

See also
Bob Steele filmography

References

External links 
 

1940 films
1940 Western (genre) films
American Western (genre) films
1940s English-language films
American black-and-white films
Films directed by George Sherman
Republic Pictures films
Three Mesquiteers films
1940s American films